Chen Ningning is the founder and president of Pioneer Metals Holdings Co., Ltd. She is a self-made billionaire, her net worth is $1.8 billion as of 2011. She graduated with an MBA degree from the New York Institute of Technology.

References

New York Institute of Technology alumni
Female billionaires
Living people
Year of birth missing (living people)